Rundāle Palace is one of the two major baroque palaces built for the Dukes of Courland in what is now Latvia, the other being Jelgava Palace. The palace was built in two periods, from 1736 until 1740 and from 1764 until 1768. It is situated at Pilsrundāle, in Rundāle Parish, Bauska Municipality in the Semigallia region,  12 km west of Bauska.

History
In 1735 Duke of Courland Ernst Johann von Biron bought land in Rundāle with an old medieval castle in the territory of a planned  summer residence. The old castle was demolished and construction after the design of Bartolomeo Rastrelli started in 1736. Construction proceeded slowly because part of the materials and resources were transferred to the construction of Jelgava Palace, a project which was more important for the duke. Following Biron's fall from grace in 1740, the palace stood unfinished and empty until 1762 when Biron returned from his exile. Under the supervision of Rastrelli its construction was finished in 1768. Johann Michael Graff produced lavish stucco decorations for the palace during this time. Ernst Johann von Biron loved the palace and moved there almost immediately in 1768. He often visited the palace and spent summers there until his death in 1772.

After Duchy of Courland and Semigallia was absorbed by the Russian Empire in 1795, Catherine the Great presented the palace to Count Valerian Zubov, the youngest brother of her lover, Prince Platon Zubov. He spent his declining years there after the death of Valerian Zubov in 1804. His young widow, Thekla Walentinowicz, a local landowner's daughter, married Count Shuvalov, and the palace passed into the control of the Shuvalov family, with whom it remained until the German occupation in World War I when the German army established a hospital and a commandant's office there. During the French invasion of Russia in 1812, the palace was used as a hospital for Napoleon's army. Several soldiers who died in this hospital were buried in the park of the palace. A monument has since been built there. At the end of the 19th century, the palace and park were restored and reconstructed.

The palace suffered serious damage in 1919 during the Latvian War of Independence. During their retreat Bermontians partially burned the palace. In 1920 after Latvian agrarian reforms the palace became the property of the Ministry of Agriculture. Part of the premises was occupied by the local school and part was reconstructed as flats for Latvian military veterans. Though still used as a school, Rundāle Palace was included in the list of state-protected monuments in 1924. In 1933, Rundāle Palace was taken over by the Ministry of Education and was officially reconstructed for use as a school.

The palace was dealt a serious blow after World War II, when a grain storehouse was set up in the premises in addition to the school. Later, the duke's dining room was transformed into the school's gymnasium. A school was located in the palace until 1978.

In 1963, Rundāle Palace became a branch of the Bauska local history museum. In 1965 and also in 1971, the Supreme Soviet of Latvian SSR decided to restore Rundāle Palace. In 1972, Rundāle Palace Museum was established. Latvian painter and art historian Imants Lancmanis became director of the new museum and restoration of the palace became his life's work. Extensive research and restoration work was completely funded by the state until 1992. After the restoration of Latvia's independence, the state continued to finance restoration work in part, with additional financing through private donations and later also through the Structural Funds and Cohesion Fund of the EU. In the spring of 2015 it was announced that restoration work in the Rundāle Palace was complete. Total restoration costs from 1972 until 2014 were estimated to be 8,420,495 euros.

The palace is one of the major tourist destinations in Latvia. It is also used for the accommodation of notable guests, such as the leaders of foreign nations. The palace and the surrounding gardens are now a museum.

Gallery

See also
 List of Baroque residences
 List of palaces and manor houses in Latvia
 Baltā māja

References

External links

 The Rundāle Palace Museum website.
 Rundāle Palace presented by Castles on the Web photoarchive
 Rundāle Palace Stock Photography 
 The local tourist office in Bauska
 Virtual tour of the Rundale palace at Virtual Latvia project
 Rundāle Parish on Rundale.lv
 The Association of Castles and Museums around the Baltic Sea

Houses completed in 1740
Houses completed in 1768
Palaces in Latvia
Museums established in 1972
Baroque palaces in Latvia
Museums in Latvia
Historic house museums in Europe
Shuvalov family
1768 establishments in the Polish–Lithuanian Commonwealth
Bauska Municipality
Bauske County
Semigallia
Bartolomeo Rastrelli buildings